Phenolic is an adjective and a substantive (noun) that may apply to :

 Phenol (or carbolic acid), a colorless crystalline solid and aromatic compound
 Phenols, a class of chemical compounds that include phenol
 Phenolic content in wine
 Phenolic paper, a type of cardboard used for printed circuit boards
 Phenolic resin, a type of synthetic polymer
 Phenolic taint, a wine fault due to 4-vinylphenol formation by Brettanomyces bruxellensis
 Polyphenols, non-polymeric phytochemical compounds containing multiple phenol substructures

See also